Robert, Rob, Robbie, Bob or Bobby Williams may refer to:

Entertainment

Film
 Robert Williams (actor, born 1894) (1894–1931), American stage and film actor
 Robert B. Williams (actor) (1904–1978), American film actor
 R. J. Williams (born 1978), American former child actor and later internet entrepreneur
 Rob Williams (filmmaker), American film director

Music
 Robert Pete Williams (1914–1980), American blues guitarist
 Chocolate Williams (Robert Williams Jr., 1916–1984), jazz bassist and blues vocalist
 Bob Williams (singer) (1918–2003), American singer and one of the Williams Brothers
 Robert Williams (singer) (1949–2022), Greek singer and composer
 Robert S. Williams (born 1949), bassoon player of the Detroit Symphony Orchestra
 Robert Williams (drummer) (born 1955), Captain Beefheart, Hugh Cornwell, and solo
 Robbie Williams (born 1974), British pop singer and former member of Take That
 Rob Williams (1979–2009), partner of business Dolphin Music
 Meek Mill (Robert Rihmeek Williams, born 1987), American rapper

Writers
 Robert Williams (poet) (1744–1815), Welsh poet
 Robert Williams (Robert ap Gwilym Ddu) (1767–1850), Welsh-language poet
 Robert Williams (Trebor Mai) (1830–1877), Welsh-language poet
 Robert Moore Williams (1907–1977), American science fiction novelist
 Robert Williams (artist) (born 1943), cartoonist and painter
 Rob Williams (comics), British comic writer

Military 
 Robert Williams (Royal Navy officer) (1765–1827) English rear-admiral in the Royal Navy
 Robert Williams (adjutant general) (1829–1901), American brigadier general and Adjutant General of the US Army
 Robert Williams (Medal of Honor) (1837–unknown), American sailor and Medal of Honor recipient
 Robert B. Williams (general) (1901–1977), World War II major general in the United States Army Air Forces
 Robert H. Williams (soldier) (1908–1983), American Marine brigadier general

Politics

UK
 Sir Robert Williams, 2nd Baronet (c. 1627–1678), MP for Carnarvonshire, 1656–1658, and for Carnarvon Boroughs, 1659
 Robert Williams (died 1763) (1695–1763), MP for Montgomeryshire, 1740–1741 and 1742–1747
 Robert Williams (1735–1814) (1735–1814), MP for Dorchester, 1807–1812
 Sir Robert Williams, 9th Baronet (1764–1830) of Penryn, MP for Carnarvonshire, 1790–1826, and for Beaumaris, 1826–1831
 Robert Williams (1767–1847) (1767–1847), MP for Dorchester, 1812–1835
 Robert Williams (1811–1890) (1811–1890), MP for Dorchester, 1835–1841
 Sir Robert Williams, 1st Baronet, of Bridehead (1848–1943), Conservative MP for West Dorset, 1895–1922

US
 Robert Williams (Mississippi politician) (1773–1836), Governor of the Mississippi Territory
 Robert P. Williams (1841–1910), State Treasurer of Missouri, 1901–1905
 Robert L. Williams (1868–1948), American politician, governor of Oklahoma
 Robert R. Williams, mayor of Miami, 1937–1939
 Bo Williams (Robert Warren Williams, born 1938), mayor of Shreveport, Louisiana
 Bob Williams (West Virginia politician) (born 1951), American politician and state senator in West Virginia
 Bob Williams (Washington politician), member of the Washington House of Representatives
 Robert Q. Williams (born 1964), member of the South Carolina House of Representatives

Elsewhere
 Robert Wynn Williams (1864–1929), member of the Queensland Legislative Assembly, Australia
 Robert Williams (Victorian politician) (1870–1938), Australian politician
 Robert Arthur Williams (born 1933), consultant and political figure in British Columbia, Canada
 Robbie Williams (politician) ( 1960–2007), Australian politician

Religion
 Robert Williams (antiquary) (1810–1881), Welsh Anglican clergyman and Celtic scholar
 Robert Williams (archdeacon of Carmarthen) (1863–1938), Welsh historian and Anglican priest
 Robert Dewi Williams (1870–1955), Welsh schoolteacher, Presbyterian minister, and author
 Robert Williams (archdeacon of Gower) (born 1951), Welsh Anglican priest
 Robert Williams (American priest) (1955–1992), first openly gay male priest in the American Episcopal Church

Science
 Robert Statham Williams (1859–1945), American bryologist
 Sir Robert Williams, 1st Baronet, of Park (1860–1938), Scottish mining engineer, explorer, and railway developer
 Robert R. Williams (1886–1965), American chemist who first synthesized vitamin B1
 Robert Hardin Williams (1909–1979), American endocrinologist and diabetologist
 Robert Williams (physician) (1916–2003), Welsh pathologist
 Robin Williams (mathematician) (1919–2013), New Zealand mathematician, university administrator and civil servant
 Robert Williams (English chemist) (1926–2015), Professor of Oxford University
 Robert Williams (psychologist) (born 1930), second president of the Association of Black Psychologists
 Robert Williams (astronomer) (born 1940), director of STScI 1993–98; president of IAU, 2009–2012
 Robin Williams (physicist) (Robert Hughes Williams, born 1941), Welsh physicist and academic
 Robert H. Williams (physicist), environmental scientist at the Princeton Environmental Institute
 Bobby G. Williams (born 1951), Jet Propulsion Laboratory engineer; namesake of asteroid 5642 Bobbywilliams

Sports

American football
 Bob Williams (coach) (1877–1957), American college football coach
 Bob Williams (quarterback) (1930–2016), football player for Notre Dame
 Bobby Williams (defensive back) (1942–2012), American pro football player, St. Louis Cardinals and the Detroit Lions
 Bob Williams (American football coach), at Livingston State Teachers College, now University of West Alabama, 1952
 Robert Williams (quarterback), football player for Notre Dame, 1956–1958
 Bobby Williams (born 1958), tight end, coach
 Robert Williams (cornerback) (born 1962), former American football cornerback
 Bobbie Williams (born 1976), American football guard
 Robert Williams (defensive back) (born 1977), former American football cornerback

Baseball
 Bob Williams (baseball) (1884–1962), baseball player for the New York Highlanders/Yankees
 Bobby Williams (baseball) (1895–1978), American baseball shortstop and manager in the Negro leagues
 Robert Williams (baseball) (1917–2000), American baseball pitcher and infielder in the Negro leagues

Basketball
 Bob Williams (basketball, born 1931), American professional basketball player, played collegiately at Florida A&M
 Bob Williams (basketball, born 1953), American basketball coach, most recently with UC Santa Barbara
 Rob Williams (basketball) (1961–2014), American professional basketball player, played collegiately for Houston
 Robert Williams III (born 1997), American professional basketball player, played collegiately for Texas A&M
 Robert Williams (Grambling State basketball), American college basketball player for Grambling State

Cricket
 Robert Williams (South African cricketer) (1912–1984), South African cricketer
 Robert Williams (English cricketer) (born 1970), English former cricketer
 Robbie Williams (cricketer) (born 1987), English cricketer for Middlesex

Football and rugby
 Bobbie Williams (rugby union) (1865–1967), Welsh international rugby union player
 Bobby Williams (Scottish footballer) (died 1916), Scottish footballer
 Bob Williams (rugby) (1886–1969), Australian rugby league footballer
 Bob Williams (Australian rules footballer) (1913–2004), Australian rules footballer with Hawthorn
 Bobby Williams (footballer, born 1932), English footballer for Chester City
 Bobby Williams (footballer, born 1940), English footballer
 Robbie Williams (footballer, born 1979), English footballer for Warrington Town
 Robbie Williams (footballer, born 1984), English footballer for Limerick
 Robert Williams (footballer, born 1927), English footballer for Wrexham and Shrewsbury Town
 Robert Williams (footballer, born 1932), English footballer for Mansfield Town

Other sports
 Robert Williams (archer) (1841–1914), American archer
 Bob Williams (rower) (1931–2017), Canadian rower
 Robbie Williams (snooker player) (born 1986), English snooker player
 Rob Williams (rower, born 1960), British rower
 Rob Williams (rower, born 1985), British Olympian

Other
 Robert A. Williams Jr., American lawyer and professor
 Robert S. C. Williams, community service worker in Ontario, Canada
 Robert C. Williams, the namesake of the Robert C. Williams Paper Museum
 Robert F. Williams (1925–1996), American civil rights activist
 Robert Wayne Williams (1952–1983), American murderer executed in Louisiana
 Robert Williams (architect) (1848–1918), Welsh architect and social campaigner
 Robert Williams (geometer) (born 1942), American designer, mathematician, and architect
 Robert Williams (robot fatality) (1953–1979), the first person to be killed by a robot
 Robert Williams (trade union leader) (1881–1936), British trade union organizer

See also 
 Bert Williams (disambiguation)
 Robin Williams (disambiguation)
 William Roberts (disambiguation)
 5642 Bobbywilliams, Mars-crossing asteroid
 Vila Robert Williams, former name of Caála, Angola
 Williams (surname)